The Legislative Assembly of Alberta is the deliberative assembly of the province of Alberta, Canada. It sits in the Alberta Legislature Building in Edmonton. The Legislative Assembly currently has 87 members, elected first past the post from single-member electoral districts. Bills passed by the Legislative Assembly are given royal assent by the lieutenant governor of Alberta, as the viceregal representative of the King of Canada. The Legislative Assembly and the Lieutenant Governor together make up the unicameral Alberta Legislature.

The maximum period between general elections of the assembly, as set by Section 4 of the Canadian Charter of Rights and Freedoms is five years, which is further reinforced in Alberta's Legislative Assembly Act. Convention dictates the premier controls the date of election and usually selects a date in the fourth or fifth year after the preceding election. Amendments to Alberta's Elections Act introduced in 2011 fixed the date of election to between March 1 and May 31 in the fourth calendar year following the preceding election. Alberta has never had a minority government, so an election as a result of a vote of no confidence has never occurred.

To be a candidate for election to the assembly, a person must be a Canadian citizen older than 18 who has lived in Alberta for at least six months before the election and has registered with Elections Alberta under the Election Finances and Contributions Disclosure Act. Senators, senators-in-waiting, members of the House of Commons, and criminal inmates are ineligible.

The current and 30th Alberta Legislative Assembly was elected on April 16, 2019.

History

The first session of the first Legislature of Alberta opened on March 15, 1906, in the Thistle Rink, Edmonton, north of Jasper Avenue. After the speech from the throne, the assembly held its sessions in the McKay Avenue School. In this school Alberta MLAs chose the provincial capital, Edmonton, and the future site for the Alberta Legislature Building: the bank of the North Saskatchewan River. Allan Merrick Jeffers, a graduate of the Rhode Island School of Design was the architect who was chosen to build the assembly building. In September 1912 Prince Arthur, Duke of Connaught and Strathearn, Governor General of Canada, declared the building officially open.

Louise McKinney and Roberta MacAdams were the first women elected to the assembly, in the 1917 election. They were also the first women in any legislature of the British Empire.

Current members 
The current members of the Legislature were elected in the 30th Alberta general election held on April 16, 2019. Bold indicates cabinet members, and party leaders are italicized.

* Absent from Legislature during 2008–2012 term† Absent from Legislature during 2015–2019 term‡ Absent from Legislature during 2015-2022 before returning in 2022 by-election§ Absent from Legislature during 2018-2022 before returning in 2022 by-election

Standings during 30th Assembly
The 30th Alberta Legislative Assembly was constituted after the general election on April 16, 2019. The United Conservative Party, led by Jason Kenney, won a majority of seats and formed the government. The New Democrats, led by outgoing Premier Rachel Notley, won the second most seats and formed the official opposition.

Seating plan
 Party leaders are italicized. Bold indicates cabinet minister.

References

External links
 Legislative Assembly of Alberta web site
 Legislative Assembly of Alberta history - Citizens guide
 Canadian Governments Compared
Legislative Assembly of Alberta - History

Alberta
Alberta